The Doctor's Secret is a 1909 French short silent film by Georges Méliès. It was sold by Méliès's Star Film Company and is numbered 1476–1485 in its catalogues.

Méliès appears in the film as the hydrotherapist. Photographic evidence suggests that the film was a new version of an unidentified Méliès film from around 1900, for which two stills survive at the Cinémathèque Française. The bathtub prop was reused from Méliès's 1907 film Rogues' Tricks; special effects in the film were worked with substitution splices, stage machinery, and pyrotechnics.

References

External links
 

French black-and-white films
Films directed by Georges Méliès
French silent short films